The Patriot League baseball tournament is the conference baseball championship of the NCAA Division I Patriot League.  The top four finishers in the regular season of the conference's six teams advance to the best of three championship series, with each series hosted by the higher seeded team.  The winner of the tournament receives an automatic berth to the NCAA Division I Baseball Championship.

Format
For the first two seasons, the tournament matched the winners of the Patriot League's two divisions in a best of three series.  After the end of divisional play (which coincided with Colgate's departure) for the 1995 season, no event was held.  The new incarnation in 1996 featured the top three teams meeting at the home of the regular season champion.  The second and third seeds played a single game to determine who would face the top seed in a best of three series.  In 2008, the format expanded to four teams and returned to the best of three series format for both the semifinal and final rounds.

Champions

By year
The following is a list of conference champions listed by year.

By school
The following is a list of conference champions listed by school.

Italics indicate that the program no longer fields a baseball team in the Patriot League.

References